Frederick Hubert Beerworth (6 May 1886 – 17 May 1968) was an Australian politician. Born in Quorn, South Australia, he received a primary education before becoming a farmer at Carrieton. He was a railway worker and engine driver before serving in the military 1914–1918. After serving on West Torrens Shire Council he was president of the Australian Federated Union of Locomotive Enginemen 1940–1941. His brother, James Beerworth, was a state parliamentarian in South Australia from 1933 to 1947.

In 1946, Beerworth was elected to the Australian Senate as a Labor Senator for South Australia. He was due to begin his term on 1 July 1947, but joined the Senate in September 1946 to fill the remainder of the casual vacancy term of Ted Mattner, who was defeated at the 1946 election. Beerworth retired in 1951, and died in 1968.

References

External links

1886 births
1968 deaths
Australian Labor Party members of the Parliament of Australia
Members of the Australian Senate for South Australia
Members of the Australian Senate
Australian trade union leaders
Australian people of German descent
20th-century Australian politicians
Military personnel from South Australia
Australian military personnel of World War I